Andrey Samokhin (born January 20, 1985) is an amateur Kazakh Greco-Roman wrestler, who played for the men's light heavyweight category. He won a bronze medal for his division at the 2008 Asian Wrestling Championships in Jeju City, South Korea, and silver at the 2009 Asian Wrestling Championships in Pattaya, Thailand.

Samokhin represented Kazakhstan at the 2008 Summer Olympics, where he competed for the men's 84 kg class. He received a bye for the second preliminary round, before losing out to Russia's Alexei Mishin, with a two-set technical score (1–2, 0–3), and a classification point score of 1–3.

References

External links
Profile – International Wrestling Database
NBC Olympics Profile

1985 births
Living people
Olympic wrestlers of Kazakhstan
Wrestlers at the 2008 Summer Olympics
Sportspeople from Karaganda
Kazakhstani male sport wrestlers
Asian Wrestling Championships medalists
21st-century Kazakhstani people